The 1936 Sewanee Tigers football team was an American football team that represented Sewanee: The University of the South as a member of the Southeastern Conference during the 1936 college football season. In their sixth season under head coach Harry E. Clark, Sewanee compiled a 0–6–1 record.

Schedule

References

Sewanee
College football winless seasons
Sewanee Tigers football seasons
Sewanee Tigers football